The National Salvation Front in Syria ( Jabhat Al-Khalāṣ Al-Waṭanīy fi Sūrīya) was a Syrian opposition political party founded and based in Belgium. The party was formed in the wake of assassination of Rafic Hariri and Syria's withdrawal from Lebanon in 2005. During that time, it was Syria's largest exile opposition party.

References

External links
 website of the NSFS

2005 establishments in Syria
Defunct political parties in Syria
Organizations of the Syrian civil war
Political parties established in 2005
Political parties with year of disestablishment missing
Syrian opposition